Sherborne Girls, formally known as Sherborne School for Girls, is an independent day and boarding school for girls, located in Sherborne, North Dorset, England. There were 485 pupils attending in 2019–2020, with over 90 per cent of them living on campus in the seven boarding houses. Recognition for Sherborne Girls has included a double "excellent" rating in its Independent Schools Inspectorate Report and the title of Best Public School of The Year at the Tatler Schools Awards 2017/2018.

Curriculum
The school, founded in 1899 by John and Charlotte Wingfield Digby, requires all girls to take English, maths, a science subject, religion and a foreign language. Most girls take nine or ten GCSEs and three or four A Level subjects. Sherborne Girls previously offered the International Baccalaureate programme.

Some subjects at AS/A Level are taught jointly with Sherborne School for boys, under a cooperation scheme. Both also collaborate in activities and functions such as theatre productions, specialist societies and social activities.

Houses
The house system is based mainly on the boarding houses, as most pupils are boarders. The day pupils (about 10 per cent) are distributed among them.

The seven boarding houses on campus are: 
Aldhelmsted East 
Aldhelmsted West (lower fourth and upper fourth aged 11–13) 
Dun Holme 
Kenelm 
Mulliner (upper sixth) 
Reader Harris (formerly Ealhstan and Thurstan) 
Wingfield-Digby (formerly Aylmar and Wingfield)

Facilities
The campus includes Oxley Sports Centre, which opened in 2007, with a swimming pool, a fitness suite, squash courts, badminton courts, a floodlit Astro Turf hockey pitch, a climbing wall, a bouldering wall, grass pitches and dance studio.

Notable alumnae
Alumnae are British unless otherwise stated. In alphabetical surname order:
Maria Aitken (born 1945), writer, producer and director
Leonora Anson, Countess of Lichfield (born 1949)
Camila Batmanghelidjh CBE (born 1963), psychotherapist, founder and Director of Kids Company
Rosa Beddington (1956–2001), biologist
Nina Coltart (1927–1997), psychoanalyst and psychotherapist
Margaret Dix (1902–1991), neurologist
Princess Elizabeth of Toro (born 1936), Ugandan lawyer and politician
Diana Reader Harris (1912–1996), educator and public figure
Princess Rahma bint Hassan (born 1969), Jordanian educator
Princess Sumaya bint Hassan (born 1971), Jordanian science activist
Deirdre Hutton DBE (born 1949), public servant
Rajkumari Amrit Kaur (1889–1964), Indian cabinet minister
Diana Keppel, Countess of Albemarle DBE (1909–2013), youth and development activist
Sophie Kinsella (Madeleine Sophie Townley), (born 1969), author
Emma Kirkby DBE, (born 1949) early-music soprano
Mary Lascelles (1900–1995), literary scholar
Margaret Macmillan (born 1953), University of Oxford academic
Santa Montefiore (born 1970), author
Daphne Oram (1925–2003), composer and electronic musician
Tara Palmer-Tomkinson (1971–2017), television personality
E. Arnot Robertson (1903–1961), novelist, critic and broadcaster
Kate Rock, Baroness Rock (born 1968), politician
Winifred Spooner (1900–1933), aviator
Juliet Wheldon DCB, QC (1950–2013), civil servant

References

External links
School Website
Profile on the Independent Schools Council website
Ofsted Boarding Social Care Inspection Reports
Independent Schools Inspectorate Inspection Reports
Independent Report on The Good Schools Guide

Girls' schools in Dorset
Private schools in Dorset
Educational institutions established in 1899
1899 establishments in England
Member schools of the Girls' Schools Association
International Baccalaureate schools in England
Boarding schools in Dorset
Church of England private schools in the Diocese of Salisbury
Sherborne
Girls boarding schools